ZDHHC8 is a putative palmitoyltransferase enzyme containing a DHHC domain that in humans is encoded by the ZDHHC8 gene.

References

Further reading